Goryushino is a rural locality (a selo) in Sosnovsky Selsoviet, Zarinsky District, Altai Krai, Russia. The population was 8 as of 2013. There is 1 street.

Geography 
Goryushino is located on the Stepnoy Alambay River, 46 km northeast of Zarinsk (the district's administrative centre) by road. Sosnovka is the nearest rural locality.

References 

Rural localities in Zarinsky District